Richard Bohringer (born 16 January 1942) is a French actor.

Personal life
Bohringer was born in Moulins, Allier, to a French mother and a German father. He is the father of actress Romane Bohringer, and has three other children, Mathieu, Richard and Lou.

Career
Besides acting Bohringer is also a musician, writer, and poet who has produced and directed several films.

Bohringer won the César Award for Best Supporting Actor in 1985, and the César Award for Best Actor in 1988.

Selected filmography

References

External links
 

1941 births
Living people
People from Moulins, Allier
French male stage actors
French male film actors
French male television actors
Best Actor César Award winners
Best Supporting Actor César Award winners
20th-century French male actors
21st-century French male actors
French male screenwriters
French screenwriters
French film directors
French film producers
French male singers
French people of German descent